Ardhangini is a 1959 Indian Hindi-language romance film produced and directed by Ajit Chakrabarty. The film stars Meena Kumari and Raaj Kumar. It was later remade in Tamil as Panithirai (1961).

Plot 

A woman dies while giving birth to her daughter Chhaya. The girl's father loses his job and the family home is burned. For this reason, everyone around her superstitiously see her as a harbinger of bad luck. Chhaya falls in love with Prakash, a non-superstitious airline pilot who treats her normally, but problems arise when Prakash's aeroplane goes missing.

Cast 
 Meena Kumari as Chhaya
 Raaj Kumar as Capt Prakash
 Agha as Murari
 C. S. Dube as Prakash's maternal uncle
 Shivraj as Ram Lal
 Durga Khote as Prakash's mother
 Praveen Paul as Murari's mother
 Shubha Khote as Leela

Production 
Ardhangini was produced and directed by Ajit Chakrabarty under Mars and Movies. The film's story was written by Chandrakant, the screenplay by Vishwamitter Adil and Shashi Bhushan, and the dialogues by Vishwamitter Adil. Cinematography was handled by R. M. Sabnis, and editing by C. Ramrao.

Themes 
The film speaks against untouchability and superstitious beliefs. Many commentators have identified it as a "romantic tragi-comedy".

Soundtrack 
The soundtrack was composed by Vasant Desai, and the lyrics were written by Majrooh Sultanpuri.

Reception 
The Indian Express wrote, "Imaginatively directed by Ajit [Chakrabarty], the film should appeal to family audiences".

References

Bibliography

External links 
 

1950s Hindi-language films
1950s romance films
1950s satirical films
Films about superstition
Hindi films remade in other languages
Hindi-language romance films
Indian romance films
Indian satirical films